Llechwedd Du is a subsidiary summit of Esgeiriau Gwynion in north Wales. It forms a long peat bog plateau that start at the end of Esgeiriau Gwynion's south ridge, and ends with the higher summit of Moel y Cerrig Duon.

The summit is located on one of the large peat hags at the western edge of the plateau, and is marked by a few stones. To the east is Moel y Cerrig Duon, Foel y Geifr and the Berwyn range, to the south is Gwaun Lydan and to the west is Aran Fawddwy and Foel Hafod-fynydd. The plateau is crossed by a road at Bwlch y Groes, the pass between Llechwedd Du and Moel y Cerrig Duon.

References

Mountains and hills of Gwynedd
Mountains and hills of Snowdonia
Hewitts of Wales
Nuttalls